King Kong by Starship, formerly known as King Kong Entertainment before the merge in 2017, is a South Korean actors agency that was founded in 2009.

History
It was founded in 2009 by Lee Jin-sung, then an employee of IHQ Inc., and having Kim Bum as the company's first artist.

In 2015, the company was acquired by Starship Entertainment, a subsidiary of Kakao M (now Kakao Entertainment). In 2017, upon the merger of the businesses of the two companies, the company was relaunched as "King Kong by Starship".

Artists
List adapted from official website.

 Ahn So-yo
 Bona
 Chae Soo-bin
 Cheon Young-min
 Cho Yoon-woo
 Choi Hee-jin
 Choi Won-myeong
 Go Ara
 Han Min
 Hyungwon
 Jeon So-min
 Jo Yoon-hee
 Jung Joon-won
 Jung Won-chang
 Kang Eun-ah
 Kim Bum
 Kim Seung-hwa
 Kim Shana
 Lee Da-yeon

 Lee Dong-wook
 Lee Kwang-soo
 Lee Jin
 Lee Jong-hwa
 Lee Ruby
 Lee Seung-hun
 Oh Ah-yeon
 Oh So-hyun
 Park Jubi
 Ryu Hye-young 
 Shin Hyun-soo
 Shin Seung-ho
 Shownu
 Song Ha-yoon
 Song Ji-yeon
 Song Seung-heon
 Son Woo-hyeon
 Woo Hyun-jin
 Yoo Yeon-seok

Former artists

Han Chae-ah (2011–2012)
Im Soo-jung (2018–2022)
Jang Hee-jin (2012–2014)
Ji Il-joo
 Ji Woo (2019–2022)
Jung Dong-hyun
Kim Da-som (2010–2021)
Kim Ji-an (2015–2017)
Kim Ji-won (2014–2019)
Kim Min-ji (2019–2021)
Kim Sun-a (2011–2014)
Lee Chung-ah (2009–2014)
Lee Elijah (2017–2021)
Lee Ha-nui (2012–2014)
Lee Mi-yeon
Lee Young-yoo (2013–2014)
Lim Ju-eun (2013–2018)
Oh Hye-won (2016–2023)
Park Hee-soon (2015–2021)
Park Min-woo (2013–2019)
Park Min-young (2010–2014)
Seo Hyo-rim (2012–2014)
Song Min-jung (2011–2014)
Sung Yu-ri (2010–2014)
Yoon Jin-yi (2012–2019)

Awards

Notes

References

Starship Entertainment
Talent agencies of South Korea
South Korean record labels